Mitsuoka is a Japanese surname. Notable people with the surname include:

Eiji Mitsuoka (born 1976), Japanese mixed martial artist
Masami Mitsuoka, Japanese singer now known as Mizca
Natalia Mitsuoka, Argentinian figure skater
Shinya Mitsuoka, Japanese footballer

Japanese-language surnames